Bone & Joint Research (BJR) is an orthopaedic journal covering the whole spectrum of the musculoskeletal sciences, published by The British Editorial Society of Bone & Joint Surgery, a registered charity in the UK (No. 209299). BJR is a gold open access journal and hence articles published in the journal are available online to anyone, free of charge. Articles are published in a continuous publication model, and collated into monthly issues. First published in 2012, BJR is part of the Bone & Joint series of journals, which also includes Bone & Joint 360 and the flagship journal The Bone & Joint Journal (first published in 1948 as The Journal of Bone & Joint Surgery (British Volume)).

According to the Journal Citation Reports, BJR received achieved a 2019 Impact Factor Impact Factor of 3.532. The journal is also indexed in MEDLINE.

References

External links 

English-language journals
Monthly journals
Orthopedics journals